The 1926 Wake Forest Demon Deacons football team was an American football team that represented Wake Forest University during the 1926 college football season. In its first season under head coach James A. Baldwin, the team compiled a 5–4–1 record.

Schedule

References

Wake Forest
Wake Forest Demon Deacons football seasons
Wake Forest Demon Deacons football